Garden ~Summer Edit~ is FLOW's eighth single. It is a recut single from the original B-Side in their album Golden Coast. It reached #50 on the Oricon charts in its first week and charted for 2 weeks. *

Track listing

References

Flow (band) songs
2005 singles
Ki/oon Music singles
2005 songs
Song articles with missing songwriters